

P01A Agents against amoebiasis and other protozoal diseases

P01AA Hydroxyquinoline derivatives
P01AA01 Broxyquinoline
P01AA02 Clioquinol
P01AA04 Chlorquinaldol
P01AA05 Tilbroquinol
P01AA30 Tilbroquinol and tiliquinol
P01AA52 Clioquinol, combinations

P01AB Nitroimidazole derivatives
P01AB01 Metronidazole
P01AB02 Tinidazole
P01AB03 Ornidazole
P01AB04 Azanidazole
P01AB05 Propenidazole
P01AB06 Nimorazole
P01AB07 Secnidazole
P01AB51 Metronidazole and furazolidone
P01AB52 Metronidazole and diloxanide

P01AC Dichloroacetamide derivatives
P01AC01 Diloxanide
P01AC02 Clefamide
P01AC03 Etofamide
P01AC04 Teclozan

P01AR Arsenic compounds
P01AR01 Arsthinol
P01AR02 Difetarsone
P01AR03 Glycobiarsol
P01AR53 Glycobiarsol, combinations

P01AX Other agents against amoebiasis and other protozoal diseases
P01AX01 Chiniofon
P01AX02 Emetine
P01AX04 Phanquinone
P01AX05 Mepacrine
P01AX06 Atovaquone
P01AX07 Trimetrexate
P01AX08 Tenonitrozole
P01AX09 Dehydroemetine
P01AX10 Fumagillin
P01AX11 Nitazoxanide
P01AX52 Emetine, combinations

P01B Antimalarials

P01BA Aminoquinolines
P01BA01 Chloroquine
P01BA02 Hydroxychloroquine
P01BA03 Primaquine
P01BA06 Amodiaquine
P01BA07 Tafenoquine

P01BB Biguanides
P01BB01 Proguanil
P01BB02 Cycloguanil embonate
P01BB51 Proguanil and atovaquone
P01BB52 Chloroquine and proguanil

P01BC Methanolquinolines
P01BC01 Quinine
P01BC02 Mefloquine

P01BD Diaminopyrimidines
P01BD01 Pyrimethamine
P01BD51 Pyrimethamine, combinations

P01BE Artemisinin and derivatives, plain
P01BE01 Artemisinin
P01BE02 Artemether
P01BE03 Artesunate
P01BE04 Artemotil
P01BE05 Artenimol

P01BF Artemisinin and derivatives, combinations
P01BF01 Artemether and lumefantrine
P01BF02 Artesunate and mefloquine
P01BF03 Artesunate and amodiaquine
P01BF04 Artesunate, sulfalene and pyrimethamine
P01BF05 Artenimol and piperaquine
P01BF06 Artesunate and pyronaridine
P01BF07 Artemisinin and piperaquine
P01BF08 Artemisinin and naphthoquine
P01BF09 Artesunate, sulfadoxine and pyrimethamine

P01BX Other antimalarials
P01BX01 Halofantrine
P01BX02 Arterolane and piperaquine

P01C Agents against leishmaniasis and trypanosomiasis

P01CA Nitroimidazole derivatives
P01CA02 Benznidazole
P01CA03 Fexinidazole

P01CB Antimony compounds
P01CB01 Meglumine antimonate
P01CB02 Sodium stibogluconate

P01CC Nitrofuran derivatives
P01CC01 Nifurtimox
P01CC02 Nitrofural

P01CD Arsenic compounds
P01CD01 Melarsoprol
P01CD02 Acetarsol

P01CX Other agents against leishmaniasis and trypanosomiasis
P01CX01 Pentamidine isethionate
P01CX02 Suramin sodium
P01CX03 Eflornithine
P01CX04 Miltefosine

References

P01